Tangor Tapak is an Indian politician associated with the BJP party in Arunachal Pradesh.

Early life
Tapak is a physician with the state health system. In the 1999 election for the Legislative Assembly of Arunachal Pradesh he defeated Yadag Apang, the wife of Chief Minister Gegong Apang. He served as State health minister. He lost the 2004 election for the Pasighat West seat to Omak Apang, the son of Gegong and Yadag Apang, but contested the seat again in the 2009 election and won. In November 2009 he became the victim of a shooting by unknown assailants that severely damaged his car but left him uninjured. He retired from his post as State president of the BJP on 11 February 2014 and lost his seat in the legislative assembly in the May 2014 election.

References 

Bharatiya Janata Party politicians from Arunachal Pradesh
Arunachal Pradesh MLAs 2009–2014
Living people
People from Adi Community
People from East Siang district
State cabinet ministers of Arunachal Pradesh
Year of birth missing (living people)